Colomi Municipality is the second municipal section of the Chapare Province in the Cochabamba Department, Bolivia. Its seat is Colomi.

See also 
 Inkachaka

References 

 Instituto Nacional de Estadistica de Bolivia

Municipalities of the Cochabamba Department